Johnson River is the name of the following rivers:

In New Zealand
 Johnson River (New Zealand), tributary of the Allen River

In the United States
 Johnson River (Kuskokwim), tributary of the Kuskokwim River in Alaska
 Johnson River (Tanana), tributary of the Tanana River in Alaska
 Johnson River (Minnesota)

See also 
 Johnson (disambiguation)
 Johnson Creek (disambiguation)